Susan Carol Hagness is an American electrical engineer and applied electromagnetics researcher. She is the Philip Dunham Reed Professor and Department Chair of Electrical and Computer Engineering at the University of Wisconsin–Madison.

Early life and education
Hagness was born and raised in Terre Haute, Indiana where she was encouraged by mathematics professor Herb Bailey to pursue a career in STEM. He persuaded Hagness to take computer programming during the summer and entered her in Rubik's Cube competitions. Growing up, she attended high school in the Vigo County School Corporation district where she was a finalist for their Most Valuable Student contest. Hagness completed her PhD at Northwestern University after being inspired by Allen Taflove, who later became her doctoral advisor.

Career
As a graduate student, Hagness was asked to assist with Northwestern's new first-year course called "Engineering First," inspiring her to pursue a career in teaching. After graduating, Hagness chose to accept a faculty position at the University of Wisconsin–Madison (UW–Madison). Upon joining the UW–Madison's Department of Electrical and Computer Engineering in 1998, she was one of only two women in the department out of approximately 40 faculty. As an assistant professor of electrical and computer engineering at the university, she began researching the use of microwave radar imaging for breast cancer detection. In recognition of her academic research, Hagness earned a 2000 Presidential Early Career Awards for Scientists and Engineer and was named one of the world's 100 Top Young Innovators by the Massachusetts Institute of Technology's magazine, Technology Review. In 2003, she was the recipient of the Emil H. Steiger Distinguished Teaching Award from the University of Wisconsin–Madison.

In 2009, Hagness was elected a Fellow of the IEEE for her "contributions to time-domain computational electromagnetics and microwave medical imaging." She remained at UW–Madison where she was honored with the William R. Kellett Mid-Career Award for outstanding mid-career faculty members who are five to 20 years past the first promotion to a tenured position. She later collaborated with Nader Behdad to seek less invasive therapies for cancer patients after prompting from Joshua Medow. Together, they discovered that high-frequency microwaves offer a comparable ablation area. In recognition of her academic achievements, she received the Sven Berggren prize from the board of the Royal Physiographic Society in Lund in 2015.

As the Philip Dunham Reed Professor at UW-Madison, Hagness and John H. Booske were asked by Ben Tilberg of Ocean Spray Cranberries to develop a more efficient, technologically advanced method to count cranberries. The device they created automated the counting process without having to pick any berries. In the same year, she was also selected by the IEEE to be one of their distinguished lecturers. She was later named treasurer of Electrical and Computer Engineering Department Heads Association for the 2019–2020 academic year.

References

External links

Living people
People from Terre Haute, Indiana
Northwestern University alumni
University of Wisconsin–Madison faculty
Fellow Members of the IEEE
American electrical engineers
American women engineers
Year of birth missing (living people)
Microwave engineers
20th-century women engineers
21st-century women engineers
20th-century American engineers
21st-century American engineers
Women in optics
Electrical engineering academics
Scientific computing researchers
American biomedical engineers
20th-century American women
American women academics
21st-century American women
Recipients of the Presidential Early Career Award for Scientists and Engineers